Events in the year 1962 in Spain.

Incumbents
Caudillo: Francisco Franco

Births
9 January - Frank Kozik, graphic artist
23 March - Javier Melloni,  Italian-Catalan Jesuit anthropologist and theologian
19 July – Pilar Fuertes Ferragut, diplomat.
27 November - Carlos Lozano, model, actor and TV presenter
Albert Guinovart.
Enrique Urbizu.

Deaths

See also
 List of Spanish films of 1962

References

 
Years of the 20th century in Spain
1960s in Spain
Spain
Spain